The 1879 Invercargill mayoral election was held on 21 July 1879.

Councillor George Goodwillie defeated James Walker Bain.

Results
The following table gives the election results:

References

1879 elections in New Zealand
Mayoral elections in Invercargill